gVisor is a container sandbox developed by Google that focuses on security, efficiency and ease of use. gVisor implements around 200 of the Linux system calls in userspace, for additional security compared to Docker containers that run directly on top of the Linux kernel and are isolated with namespaces. Contrary to the Linux kernel the project is written in the memory-safe programming language Go to prevent common pitfalls which frequently occur with software written in C.

gVisor is being used in Google's production environment like App Engine standard environment, Cloud Functions, Cloud ML Engine and Google Cloud Run according to Google and Brad Fitzpatrick. Most recently gVisor has been integrated with Google Kubernetes Engine and it allows users to sandbox their Kubernetes pods for use cases like SaaS and multitenancy.

References

Google software
Free software
Linux APIs